Juan Máximo Rojas Proenza, known as Max Rojas (June 4, 1940 – April 24, 2015) was a Mexican poet, essayist, literary critic and culture manager. He wrote long-winded poem Cuerpos, his last published work originally composed of three thousand pages and that could fill twenty volumes, publishing only four.

He studied literary studies at the Facultad de Filosofía y Letras (UNAM) of the National Autonomous University of Mexico. In 1985 he published ten poems in Calandria de tolvañeras magazine, edited by Infrarrealismo movement. These poems will be part of the 1986 book Ser en la sombra. He was director of the Institute of Right of Asylum-Museo Casa de Leon Trotsky from 1994 to 1998. It was part of the Sistema Nacional de Creadores de Arte (National System of Art Creators) from 2006 to 2009 and 2010–2013, and participated in the Iztapalapa Council of Cultural Development and South Museums Circuit.

List of works
 1971: El Turno del Aullante
 1986: Ser en la sombra
 1997: El turno del Aullante y otros poemas
 2008: Memoria de los cuerpos. Cuerpos uno.
 2008: Antología de cuerpos.
 2008: Sobre cuerpos y esferas. Cuerpos dos.
 2008: El suicida y los péndulos. Cuerpos tres.
2008: Cuerpos uno: Memoria de los Cuerpos
2008: Cuerpos dos: Sobre Cuerpos y Esferas
2008: Cuerpos tres: El Suicida y los Péndulos
2009: Cuerpos cuatro: Prosecución de los naufragios
2011: Cuerpos
2011: Obra primera (1958–1986)
2013: Poemas inéditos

Awards
Carlos Pellicer Iberoamerican Prize in Poetry, 2009.

References

1940 births
2015 deaths
20th-century Spanish poets
20th-century Spanish male writers
21st-century Spanish poets
Mexican essayists
Male essayists
Mexican male poets
Mexican male writers
National Autonomous University of Mexico alumni
Writers from Mexico City
20th-century essayists
21st-century essayists
21st-century Spanish male writers